Karumbakkam is a village located in the Chengalpattu taluk of the Kanchipuram district of the Indian state Tamil Nadu.

References 

Kanchipuram district